My Beloved Sister (lit. "Older Sister") is a 2006 South Korean television series starring Song Yoon-ah and Kim Sung-soo. It aired on MBC from August 12, 2006 to February 18, 2007 on Saturdays and Sundays at 19:55 for 55 episodes.

Song stars as the titular older sister who must carry the family when the world is pulled out from under her.

Plot
Coming from a wealthy family, graduate art student Yoon Seung-joo (Song Yoon-ah) has always lived life with confidence and strong will. She is self-centered, fickle, and quick to lose her temper with her brothers yet is sweet to her boyfriend. But when their father goes bankrupt and then disappears, Seung-joo is suddenly thrown into the real world, facing debt, poverty and hardships for the first time in her life. Now the head of the household with its attendant responsibilities, she must take care of her younger brothers while holding on to her pride even when there is nowhere to turn. Seung-joo learns that there's more to life than greed and the pursuit of money; she approaches life's happy and dark moments with a light, sincere heart and gains courage and determination in the face of adversity. During these difficult times, Geon-woo (Kim Sung-soo) comes back into her life. A university lecturer, Geon-woo broke up with Seung-joo in the past because of his humble family background, but now he wants a second chance to help – and love – Seung-joo again.

Cast

Main characters
Song Yoon-ah as Yoon Seung-joo
Kim Sung-soo as Kim Geon-woo
Heo Young-ran as Yoon Soo-ah, Seung-joo's cousin
Kang Kyung-joon as Kim Geon-se, Geon-woo's brother

Supporting characters
Yoon family
Jo Kyung-hwan as Seung-joo's father 
Baek Min-hyun as Yoon Hyuk-joo, Seung-joo's brother
Maeng Se-chang as Yoon Young-joo, Seung-joo's brother
Jo Hyung-ki as Soo-ah's father 
Song Ok-sook as Soo-ah's mother

Kim family
Yoon Yoo-sun as Kim Geon-sook, Geon-woo's sister
Park Geun-hyung as Geon-woo's father 
Kim Ja-ok as Geon-woo's mother 
Oh Hyun-kyung as Geon-woo's grandfather

Extended cast
Ahn Yeon-hong as Noh Yoo-soon
Yang Hee-kyung as Geon-woo's aunt 
Kang Nam-gil as Geon-woo's aunt's husband 
Kim Sun-hwa as grocery store owner
Jung Ho-keun as loan shark
Park Eun-bin as Ji-na, Young-joo's classmate
Song Seung-hwan as Ji-na's father 
Jung Hye-sun as Ji-na's grandmother

References

External links
My Older Sister official MBC website 
My Beloved Sister at MBC Global Media

MBC TV television dramas
Korean-language television shows
2006 South Korean television series debuts
2007 South Korean television series endings
South Korean romance television series